9 Paoni - Coptic calendar - 11 Paoni

Fixed commemorations
All fixed commemorations below are observed on 10 Paoni (17 June) by the Coptic Orthodox Church.

Saints
Martyrdom of Saint Dabamon and her mother Sophia
Departure of Pope John XVI of Alexandria (1434 A.M.), (1718 A.D.)

Commemorations
Commemoration of the closing of the pagan temples and the opening of the Christian churches during the reign of Emperor Constantine the Great (312 A.D.)
Enthronement of Pope Demetrius II of Alexandria

References
Coptic Synexarion

Days of the Coptic calendar